Carlos Kurt (Rio de Janeiro,  February 10, 1933; Rio de Janeiro, March 4, 2003)  born José Carlos Kunstat, was a Brazilian actor. He is most known for his role of supporting character in the Brazilian comedic series Os Trapalhões and some of its films. He suffered from Alzheimer's disease and died in 2003.

Filmography

Film 

1968: Os Carrascos Estão Entre Nós
1969: 2000 Anos de Confusão
1971: Tô na Tua, Ô Bicho
1975: Costinha, o Rei da Selva
1976: Simbad, o Marujo Trapalhão - Ali Tuffi
1976: O Trapalhão no Planalto dos Macacos
1977: Prá Ficar Nua, Cachê Dobrado
1977: O Trapalhão nas Minas do Rei Salomão - Aristóbulo
1978: Os Trapalhões na Guerra dos Planetas - Zucco
1978: Bonitas e Gostosas
1979: Moonraker - Airport Metal Detector Guard (uncredited)
1979: Sexo e Sangue
1979: O Rei e os Trapalhões
1979: O Cinderelo Trapalhão
1979: As Borboletas Também Amam
1980: O Incrível Monstro Trapalhão
1980: Os Três Mosqueteiros Trapalhões
1980: Os Paspalhões em Pinóquio 2000
1980: O Inseto do Amor
1981: Os Saltimbancos Trapalhões
1982: Os Vagabundos Trapalhões
1983: O Trapalhão na Arca de Noé
1984: A Filha dos Trapalhões
1984: Non c'è due senza quattro
1986: Os Trapalhões e o Rei do Futebol - Cartola (uncredited)

Television 
Os Trapalhões
Champagne (1983)

References

Materia na Veja
Link para materia na Revista Veja SP

External links
 

1933 births
2003 deaths
Brazilian male film actors
Brazilian male comedians
Male actors from Rio de Janeiro (city)
Os Trapalhões
20th-century comedians